Mad Money is a 2008 crime comedy film starring Diane Keaton, Queen Latifah and Katie Holmes, and directed by Callie Khouri. It is loosely based on the 2001 British film Hot Money.

Plot
The film begins in medias res, with the suspects getting caught and being interrogated. Then it flashes back to three years earlier and the film continues forward from there, interspersed with occasional bits from the interrogation.

Three years before getting caught, Bridget Cardigan lived a comfortable upper middle class life until her husband Don Cardigan was "downsized" from his position and sank into debt. The paycheck for Selina, the housecleaner, bounces again. Selina confronts Bridget and suggests she take a job as a janitor at the Federal Reserve Bank of Kansas City.

On her first day on the job, Bridget hatches a scheme to steal worn-out dollar bills slated for destruction. For her team she chooses Nina, who works the dollar bill shredder, and Jackie, who takes bill carts from the Secret Service room to the shredding room. It takes some work to persuade Nina to join, but Jackie joins them quickly.

The plan is that in the Secret Service room Bridget will switch a cart's official Master-brand lock with a near identical lock she purchased at Home Depot. Bridget will tell Jackie the cart number and give Nina the official lock. When Jackie gets the chosen cart, she dumps some bills from the cart into a trash can before taking the cart to Nina, who then uses Bridget's key to open it and restores the official lock, and then proceeds to shred the remaining bills. Meanwhile, Bridget, in the course of her janitorial duties, retrieves the dumped bills from the trash and splits them among Nina and Jackie in the women's restroom.

Their first robbery is a success though the take is not as big as they had hoped. However, they're emboldened to do it repeatedly. Once Don and Bridget pay off their debt, Don suggests they stop before they get caught. Bridget rejects this idea and persuades Nina and Jackie to keep going. They almost get caught but they end up cutting in Barry, one of the security guards, who is attracted to Nina.

A Federal Bank Examiner shows up at a party at Bridget's house, and the next day Bridget sees him at work. The Examiner confronts Glover, who is unwilling as a matter of professional pride to admit anyone has stolen a single bill out of his bank. Tipped off, that night Bridget and her accomplices begin trying to get rid of all the loot stashed in their houses, but the cops move in before all the evidence is destroyed. Bridget escapes but the others get caught.

Bridget hires a tax attorney to defend them. The lawyer gets Bridget and all her accomplices off the hook for their crimes, because neither the law enforcement, nor the examiner can prove that the large stash of cash in their homes came from the Federal Reserve Bank. Technically, it isn't illegal to have a couple of hundred thousand dollars in cash lying around inside a private residence. However, they spent a large sum of that stolen cash to buy expensive objects and improvements on their houses, and did not pay the taxes for them because they couldn't justify the income. The IRS demands they pay their taxes, which "turn out" to be equal in amount to the money that still remains.

Eight months later, Bridget reveals to Nina and Jackie that she had stashed away much of the stolen money in the basement of a friend's bar.

Cast

Development

Original UK version 
Hot Money (2001), the original UK TV film produced by Granada Television, is based on the true story of three women who worked at the Bank of England and embarked on a plan to steal thousands of pounds of banknotes that were due to be destroyed at the bank's incinerating plant in Essex. No one except these women know the exact details of the theft. In the director's commentary for the Mad Money DVD, director Callie Khouri credits producer Jay Cohen with having brought the TV film to her attention and obtaining the rights to adapt it.

Khouri and Cohen worked for five years to bring a deliberately Americanized version of Hot Money to the screen using various writers. Both Diane Keaton and Queen Latifah were attached early on to the project and writers began designing the characters specifically around the two actresses.

Release

Box office
The film debuted in fifth place at the box office on its opening day in the United States, with a return of US$2.3 million from 2,470 screens. Reuters referred to this return as a "modest" result for the film's opening day. By the end of its opening weekend, Mad Money had slipped to seventh place, with a weekend take of $7.7 million. Writing for Rotten Tomatoes, Gitesh Pandya noted that the opening weekend per theater revenue "averaged a not-so-impressive $3,126." amNewYork called the film's opening weekend return "a big flop at the box office," and the New Zealand Herald described it as "a box-office flop". Richard Johnson of the New York Post wrote that the movie "bombed, debuting at an abysmal seventh place on the box-office charts." The film's four-day take was a dismal $9.2 million. The film also did not fare well in its release in other countries, and Conor Bresnan of Box Office Mojo reported that "Mad Money bombed in its first two markets" overseas. The film grossed $26.4 million worldwide.

Critical reception
Rotten Tomatoes, a review aggregator, reports that 22% of 105 surveyed critics gave the film a positive review; the average rating is 4.4/10. The website's critical consensus reads: "A laborious, unfunny and implausible heist film." On Metacritic, the film has a score of 41 out of 100, based on 31 critics, indicating "mixed or average reviews".

Roger Ebert gave the film a rating of one and a half stars, and wrote, "The bottom line is, some girls will like it, the men not so much." The film also received one and a half stars in a review in the Chicago Tribune, and Michael Phillips wrote that the film's cast was not to blame: "Do not blame the cast. The cast is game. The dreary visual scheme, however, combines unwell with the pokey, enervated rhythm of the heist scenes, and while I'm neither a medical doctor nor a script doctor, it seems this film could use a few uppers."

The film received three stars in Newsday, and Jan Stuart wrote "Mad Money is no Rififi, but Khouri and Gers invest it with an individuality and generosity of spirit that lift it into the realm of guiltless pleasure." Bill Wine of All Headline News gave the film two and a half stars, writing "Mad Money is a light and lively, likable low-tech lark. Don't expect big laughs, but you can at least bank on it to hold your interest." The Canadian Press gave the film one and a half stars, and criticized Katie Holmes's performance "While Keaton has long done zany and giddy well, and she and Latifah have an interesting contrast of personalities, Holmes' presence feels like an afterthought." In contrast, Peter Howell of the Toronto Star reviewed the film positively, praising the "exuberance of the cast." The New York Post, The New York Times and Variety also criticized Katie Holmes's performance in the film, and The New York Times called Holmes "the movie's weakest link."

In an article in the Boston Herald titled "Don't waste your Mad Money on poor comedy", Stephen Schaefer gave the film a rating of "C", writing "Even with the legendary Diane Keaton center stage, Mad Money fails to hit the stratosphere of giddy, intoxicating comedy." The film received a critical review in from Claudia Puig in USA Today "Is it the perfect crime? No, it's a particularly imperfect heist comedy that offers little entertainment value and few laughs."

The film scored a third place in the New York Post's Top 10 Worst Movies of 2008 overview.

References

External links

2008 films
2000s buddy comedy films
2000s crime comedy films
American crime comedy films
American female buddy films
American heist films
American remakes of British films
2000s English-language films
Films set in Kansas
Films set in Missouri
Overture Films films
Films scored by James Newton Howard
2008 comedy films
2000s female buddy films
Films directed by Callie Khouri
2000s American films
English-language crime comedy films